Lamprosema nomangara is a moth in the family Crambidae. It was described by Viette in 1981. It is found in Madagascar.

References

Moths described in 1981
Lamprosema
Moths of Madagascar